Máximo Gómez Airport  is a regional airport in the Ciego de Ávila Province of Cuba which serves the city of Ciego de Ávila.

History
It is named for Máximo Gómez, a Major General in the Ten Years' War (1868–1878) and Cuba's military commander in the Cuban War of Independence (1895–1898). It received flights mostly from Canada during the 1990s, with tourists going to the resorts on the island of Cayo Coco. Since the construction of Jardines Del Rey Airport in 2002, there were only domestic flights to Havana, which recently ended as well, leaving this airport unserved by any scheduled airlines. This airport closed when the new airport of Jardines Del Rey opened, in 2002.

References

External links
 
 

Airports in Cuba
Buildings and structures in Ciego de Ávila